Stubblefield was an unincorporated area in Houston County, Texas.  It is located neart the intersection of Farm to Market Road 357 and County Road 4690, about 4 miles from Kennard.

Stubblefield was founded by local resident Wyatt Stubblefield, who donated land to build a school there.  At its peak, the enrollment of the school was 27.  It was completely abandoned in 1930, save a few widely scattered houses and a cemetery.  The 2010 population estimate is 10.

Students who live in Stubblefield are zoned in the Kennard Independent School District.

References

Unincorporated communities in Houston County, Texas